Kennedia glabrata, commonly known as Northcliffe kennedia, is a species of flowering plant in the family Fabaceae and is endemic to the south-west of Western Australia. It is a prostrate shrub or creeper with trifoliate leaves and orange-pink to red flowers with a yellow centre.

Description
Kennedia glabrata is a prostrate shrub or creeper with hairy stems.

Taxonomy
Kennedia glabrata was first formally described in 1836 by John Lindley in Edwards's Botanical Register. The specific epithet (glabrata) means "nearly glabrous".

Distribution and habitat
Northcliffe kennedia grows in shallow pockets of soil on granite outcrops from Northcliffe to near Esperance.

Conservation status
Kennedia glabrata is listed as "vulnerable" under the Australian Government Environment Protection and Biodiversity Conservation Act 1999 and as "Threatened Flora (Declared Rare Flora — Extant)" under the Western Australian Biodiversity Conservation Act 2016. The main threats to the species include weed invasion, grazing pressure, disturbance by feral pigs and dieback caused by Phytophthora cinnamomi.

References

Fabales of Australia
Plants described in 1836
Rosids of Western Australia
glabrata
Taxa named by John Lindley
Endemic flora of Southwest Australia